Mahaday Weyn is a district of the Middle Shebelle region of Somalia. It's located 20 kilometer north to Jowhar.

References

Districts of Somalia